Ghost in the Shell: Arise, also known in Japan as , is an original video animation and television series that serves as a re-imagining of Masamune Shirow's Ghost in the Shell. The series features new character designs and is directed by Kazuchika Kise, screenplay by Tow Ubukata, and music by Cornelius.

Ghost in the Shell: Arise – Alternative Architecture, a recompilation of the four original parts of the OVA in a television format, aired on nine stations from April 5 to June 14, 2015. The AAA broadcast included two original episodes (later released as the fifth OVA) that help tie Ghost in the Shell: Arise with its 2015 animated film sequel Ghost in the Shell: The New Movie.

Plot

The series takes place in the year 2027, where many people in developed countries have become cyborgs with prosthetic bodies. Primarily set in the fictional Japanese Newport City, the series follows a younger Motoko Kusanagi before the formation of Public Security Section 9. At the start of Arise she is a member of the federal 501 Organization, a group who employs advanced infiltration tactics and espionage to attack or neutralize enemy threats. The 501 Organization is also the legal owner of Kusanagi's prosthetic body, which is lent to her in exchange for her services to the group. This debt displeases her and causes a disparity between herself and her employer.

Cast and characters
Arise features an original Japanese voice cast, with only one actor reprising their role from the Oshii film and Stand Alone Complex anime television series. Maaya Sakamoto replaces Atsuko Tanaka as the voice of Major Motoko Kusanagi, Sakamoto having previously voiced the Major as a child in both the film, and Stand Alone Complex series. Other changes to the cast include Kenichirou Matsuda as Batou, Tarusuke Shingaki as Togusa, Ikyuu Jyuku as Chief Daisuke Aramaki, Tomoyuki Dan as Ishikawa, Takuro Nakakuni as Saito, Yōji Ueda as Paz, and Kazuya Nakai as Borma. The Logicoma also feature in anime shorts included on the Blu-ray releases titled .

Media

Films
Each of the films are known as "borders" and have received national theatrical releases one month before the release of their Blu-ray and DVD versions. A recurring part of the films is the mysterious Fire Starter computer virus, as well as looking into the lives of Public Security Section 9's members before its formation.

The opening theme for the first four episodes is called "GHOST IN THE SHELL ARISE" and is performed by both Salyu and Cornelius, it is also used as an ending for the fifth episode, the opening of which is "Anata o tamotsu mono" by Maaya Sakamoto (who also plays the role of Major Kusanagi) and Cornelius; the ending themes are different for each episode.

Borders list

Manga
A manga original story titled  began serialization in Kodansha's Monthly Young Magazines April 2013 issue, released March 13, 2013, and ended serialization on June 20, 2016. It was compiled into seven volumes. The manga follows the story of how Batou and Kusanagi met during the civil war.

Anime

Ghost in the Shell: Arise – Alternative Architecture (officially abbreviated as Ghost in the Shell AAA) is a television broadcasting of the previously released film series alongside new content. It began airing in Japan on April 5, 2015, broadcasting from the Tokyo MX, KBS, Sun TV, TV Aichi, HTB, OX, SBS, TVQ and BS11 networks. Funimation's subtitled localization of the series began on April 8, 2015, with the digital AAA releases being released under the same Ghost in the Shell: Arise listing for the original tetralogy, but labelled as television episodes to differentiate the two.

The opening theme is "Anata o tamotsu mono" by Maaya Sakamoto (who also plays the role of Major Kusanagi) and Cornelius.

Stage play
A stage production of Ghost in the Shell Arise: GHOST is ALIVE was staged between the November 5 to 15, 2015 at the Tokyo Playhouse (Ikebukuro). Directed by Shutaro Oku and starring Kaede Aono as Motoko Kusanagi, Ren Yagami as Batou, Kentarou Kanesaki as Togusa and Ikkyuu Juku (塾 一久) reprising his role from the anime as Daisuke Aramaki. The play was presented with 3-D glasses and featured 3-D projected backdrops as well as a dance number at the end.

Promotion
On September 19, 2013, Pacific Racing and Production I.G. collaborated on an Arise themed Porsche 911 GT3R model race car labelled the NAC Ghost in the Shell ARISE DR Porsche, which was used for the official Super GT auto race. It was discontinued in March 2014 and replaced with a Love Live! theme. From November 1 until December 31, 2013, a "Ghost in the Shell: Arise Airport AR Event" was held in many Japanese airports, with AR posters scattered around Haneda Airport, Ibaraki Airport and Fukuoka Airport for visitors to scan using an official app. A free admission special event titled "Ghost in the Shell LABO ~ Shinjuku Gitai" was held in Eastern Shinjuku on November 29 to 30, 2013, where attendees received special promotional material designed after the prosthetic wiring in the series created by renowned makeup artist JIRO.

Releases

On June 14, 2013, Funimation announced that it had acquired the rights for the series for a North American release. Funimation released parts 1 and 2 on Blu-ray and DVD to North America on October 28, 2014. On January 8, 2015, it was announced that Arise would be adapted into a "TV series" in the spring of 2015. This was later confirmed to be a recompilation of the first four films into a television format, with two original episodes, collectively titled Ghost in the Shell: Arise – Alternative Architecture (Ghost in the Shell AAA).

An original episode titled "Pyrophoric Cult", was given a standalone home video release in Japan on August 26, 2015, with runtime of 50 minutes. This was reduced and split in two for the previous AAA broadcasting. The plot involves the "Fire Starter" virus explored in Arise previously and introduces the new character Pyromaniac. The episode ties into the film Ghost in the Shell: The New Movie. "Pyrophoric Cult" did not receive an English dub.

Reception
Overall reception of Ghost in the Shell: Arise has been largely positive. Initial reactions upon announcement of the series were mainly centered on the visual redesign of the cast, particularly Major Kusanagi. Upon release of the first episode, Richard Eisenbeis of Kotaku has called Arise "a worthy addition to Ghost in the Shell" and assured viewers that "the changes to the series are only skin-deep". However, he stated that the episode's themes are "things you have at least somewhat seen explored before in the other iterations of the franchise". Hugo Ozman of Twitch Film has stated similar opinions, calling Ghost Pain "interesting, but not spectacular".

Notes

References

External links
 
 Alternative Architecture homepage
 

2013 anime films
2013 manga
2015 anime television series debuts
Fiction set in 2027
Bandai Visual
Cyberpunk anime and manga
Postcyberpunk
Kodansha manga
Funimation
Arise
Fiction about memory erasure and alteration
Production I.G
Seinen manga